Mucin 2, oligomeric mucus gel-forming, also known as MUC2, is a protein that in humans is encoded by the MUC2 gene.

Function
This gene encodes a member of the mucin protein family. The protein encoded by this gene, also called mucin 2, is secreted onto mucosal surfaces.

Mucin 2 is particularly prominent in the gut where it is secreted from goblet cells in the epithelial lining into the lumen of the large intestine. There, mucin 2, along with small amounts of related-mucin proteins, polymerizes into a gel of which 80% by weight is oligosaccharide side-chains that are added as post-translational modifications to the mucin proteins. This gel provides an insoluble mucous barrier that serves to protect the intestinal epithelium.

Genetics

The mucin 2 protein features a central domain containing tandem repeats rich in threonine and proline that varies between 50 and 115 copies in different individuals. Alternatively spliced transcript variants of this gene have been described, but their full-length nature is not known.

References
 

02